Shoe-tossing, also known as shoefiti, is the act of using footwear as a projectile in a number of folk sports and cultural practices. Shoe-tossing entails throwing a pair of laced shoes onto raised wires, such as telephone wires and power lines, or tree branches, creating "shoe trees".

Geography 
Shoe-tossing occurs throughout North America, Latin America, Europe, Australia, New Zealand, North Africa and South Africa in both rural and urban areas. Often, the shoes are sneakers. Other times, they are leather shoes and boots.

Cultural 
Many cultural variations exist and differences abound between socioeconomic areas and age groups. In some cultures, shoes are flung as part of a rite of passage, like to commemorate the end of a school year or a forthcoming marriage. 

Some theories suggest the custom originated with members of the military, who are said to have thrown military boots, often painted orange or some other conspicuous color, at overhead wires as a part of a rite of passage after completing basic training or when leaving the service. In the 1997 film Wag the Dog, shoe tossing is an allegedly spontaneous tribute to Sgt. William Schumann, played by Woody Harrelson, who has purportedly been shot down behind enemy lines in Albania.

Shoe-tossing may be a form of bullying, where a bully steals a pair of shoes and tosses them where they are unlikely to be retrieved. Shoe tossing has also been explained as a practical joke played on drunks who wake up to find their shoes missing.

Shoes on a telephone wire are popularly said to be linked to organized crime, signifying the location of gang turf or commemorating the death of a gang member. The shoes are also rumored to mark a spot for drug deals; although, a 2015 study of shoe-tossing data in Chicago rejected this explanation.

Wedding custom
Shoe-throwing is a wedding superstition in several cultures. In Victorian England, people would pelt "a bride and bridegroom with old shoes when they start on their honeymoon." In Charles Dickens' novel David Copperfield (1850), the custom is recorded by the narrator following his marriage to Dora Spenlow:
In 1887, an article in The New York Times observed that: "[The] custom of throwing one or more old shoes after the bride and groom either when they go to church to be married or when they start on their wedding journey, is so old that the memory of man stretches not back to its beginning." 

Peter Ditchfield, writing in Old English Customs Extant at the Present Time (1896), expands: "We also throw old shoes after young married folk in order to express our wishes for their good fortune. Probably this was not the original meaning of the custom. The throwing of a shoe after a bride was a symbol of renunciation of dominion and authority over her by her father or guardian, and this receipt of the shoe by the bridegroom was an omen that the authority was transferred to him. In Kent the shoe is thrown by the principal bridesmaid, and the others run after it. It is supposed that she who gets it will be married first. It is then thrown amongst the men, and he who is hit will be first wedded."

Protest

In many Arab cultures, throwing a shoe at someone is considered an insult.

In 2008, Iraqi journalist Muntadar al-Zaidi was arrested for throwing two shoes at United States President George W. Bush while the president was visiting Baghdad in protest against the American military invasion and subsequent occupation. Al-Zaidi shouted in Arabic: "This is from the widows, the orphans and those killed in Iraq!" President Bush ducked and was not struck by the shoes.

Shoe throwing as an insult is not limited to the Arab world; other notable incidents have involved celebrities and world leaders including Steve McCarthy, David Beckham, Lily Allen, and Wen Jiabao.

Sports and games
Wellie wanging, or boot throwing, is a sport in which competitors are required to throw a Wellington boot as far as possible. The sport appears to have originated in the West Country of England in the 1970s, and rapidly became a popular activity at village fêtes and fundraising events across Britain. The sport is now played in many different countries, including Australia, Estonia, Finland, Germany, Ireland, Italy, New Zealand and Russia.

Shoes have also been turned into objects for many other group activities and games that involve throwing, but which don't involve throwing shoes over a wire or branch.

One Physical Education game has participants put into two groups. The two groups create two lines by sitting parallel to one another. The participants then take off their shoes and throw them into the middle of the playing area, which is in between the two groups. The game starts when the teacher or referee says so. The goal of the game is for the participants to stand up from their lines and run to the middle to find their shoe. Participants then have to put their shoes back on and sit back in the same order they were sitting. The first group to get everyone back to the line wins.

Another example of a shoe-based game is a smaller group activity that requires the following: two pairs of shoes, two chairs, two plastic bottles, and two participants. The bottles are placed in the center of the gameplay area, and the chairs are positioned on opposite sides of the bottles, so that the game play area forms a line. The two participants start in the middle by the bottles, run to their chair, sit down, take their shoes off, and throw their shoes at the bottles. Whoever hits their bottle over first wins.

Shoe throwing also appears in video games. Half Dead and Half Dead 2 feature shoe throwing as one of the main game mechanics. The game has the player trapped in square rooms with doors on all sides, and it requires them to explore different rooms in order to find the exit and escape. However, most of the rooms have deadly traps in them. The shoe throwing mechanic lets the player identify if a room has a trap in it. The player throws a shoe into a room and it will set off a trap, if there are any.

Decoration

Shoes are sometimes thrown into a tree to festoon it as a "shoe tree". Occasionally, a powerline pole or other wooden object may be decorated in the same way.

Shoe trees are generally located alongside major local thoroughfares and they may have a theme (such as high-heeled shoes).

Gang messaging
In the United States, shoe-tossing is rumored to be used by gangs for a variety of purposes. For example, shoes may be used to mark a gang's territory, commemorate a fallen member, or to commemorate a non-gang member who lived in the area. However, it is difficult to determine what shoes were placed by gang members for gang-related purposes and what shoes were flung by non-gang members for other purposes. Gangs may use shoes on wires to indicate places to acquire drugs, but police officers in several jurisdictions noted that this is a myth and has yet to be proven.

A 2003 newsletter from former Los Angeles, California, mayor James Hahn cited fears of many L.A. residents that "these shoes indicate sites at which drugs are sold or worse yet, gang turf," and that city and utility employees had launched a program to remove the shoes. A 2015 study of shoe-tossing data in Chicago found that the rumor and relationship between dangling shoes and drug dealing were correlational, not causal.

See also
 Abandoned footwear
 Panty tree
Ghost shoes (traffic fatality memorial)

References

External links

 Close-Up: New York's hanging sneakers – BBC News report looking at the phenomenon

Articles containing video clips
Gangs in the United States
Recurring elements in folklore
Street games
Urban legends
Uses of shoes
Vandalism